Darsie Watson (15 July 1889 – 19 November 1964) was an English cricketer. Watson was a right-handed batsman. He was born at Teddington, Middlesex and educated at Marlborough College, Wiltshire.

Watson made a single first-class appearance for Sussex against Essex at the County Ground, Hove in the 1920 County Championship. In Sussex's first-innings, he was dismissed for a duck by Johnny Douglas, while in their second-innings he was dismissed for 3 runs by Percy Toone. This was his only major appearance for Sussex.

He died at Charing Cross, London on 19 November 1964.

References

External links
 Darsie Watson at ESPNcricinfo
 Darsie Watson at CricketArchive

1889 births
1964 deaths
People from Teddington
People educated at Marlborough College
English cricketers
Sussex cricketers